Anjarak-e Bala is a village in Nosratabad Rural District, in the Corrin of Zahedan County, Sistan and Baluchestan Province, Iran. At the 2006 census, its population was 27, in 6 families.

References 

Populated places in Zahedan County